Rita Pavone (born August 23, 1945) is an Italian-Swiss ballad and rock singer and actress, who enjoyed success through the 1960s.

Singing career
She was born in Turin, Italy. In 1962 she participated in, and won, the first Festival degli Sconosciuti ("Festival of the Unknown"), a song competition for amateur artists. Her self-titled 1963 album, led by the hit single  ("The Soccer Game") made her a national star at 17, and international attention soon followed.  sold over one million copies and was awarded a gold disc.

In the summer of 1964, she had chart success in North America with a single "Remember Me", sung in English, backed with "Just Once More". The song reached number 26 in the United States and number 16 in Canada.

In 1965, Pavone made her first appearance on The Ed Sullivan Show; she became a frequent musical guest there until 1970. Meanwhile she scored a string of hits, both ballads and rock songs in Spain, where she became a teen idol, enjoying so much fame there that it was commented during a 2005 Spanish-television documentary that such success there for a foreign singer is rare.

In the United States she sang alongside Diana Ross and The Supremes, Ella Fitzgerald, Tom Jones, Duke Ellington, and Paul Anka. She also sang at Carnegie Hall in New York City.  It is said that Elvis Presley made a painting of her after she went to Memphis and met her at a recording studio.  It is also said that she recorded a duet with Barbra Streisand, but this has remained unsubstantiated.  There is, however, an indoor photograph of Pavone and Streisand together, apparently shot in New York City in May 1964.

Although her movie career targeted a teen audience and lacked great artistic value, today her films have found a cult niche. 

Pavone was also popular in the UK during 1966 and 1967. RCA Victor issued two of her singles; in quick succession both were hits, "Heart" peaking at number 27 and "You Only You" peaking at number 21 in the UK Singles Chart.
During this same period she appeared at the London Palladium. She also recorded Andrew Lloyd Webber's "Try It And See",  which later became "King Herod's Song" in the rock opera, Jesus Christ Superstar.

In 1968, Pavone married Teddy Reno in Switzerland. He was her talent scout and the organizer of the first song contest she won, but their union caused a scandal in Italian society, because he was still married to his first wife, Livia Protti, and Italy had no divorce law until 1970. They remarried in Italy in 1971 and had two sons: Alessandro in 1969 and Giorgio in 1974.

During the 1980s, Pavone acted in comedy films including 2 sul Pianerottolo, Risate in Salotto, and Santarellina.

In 1992, Pavone returned to the United States, where she sang during a multiple-artist concert that included Whitney Houston, Frank Sinatra, the Bolshoi Ballet, and Cher at the Sands hotel in Atlantic City. She then turned to theater acting and participated in a William Shakespeare play. In 2002 she gave a concert at Miami's Dade Auditorium.

The main character in the Argentinian film Nine Queens tries to remember the tune of a Rita Pavone song throughout the story; the song, "Il Ballo del Mattone", plays as the end credits run.

Pavone was a Senate candidate in the Italian general election of 2006.

She participated at the Sanremo Music Festival 2020 with the song .

Pavone and her husband Reno now live in Ticino, Switzerland. Their elder son Alessandro is a radio-show host, and their younger son Giorgio is a rock singer.

Discography
Pavone mainly recorded for RCA until 1968, then signed briefly with Ricordi, which launched her vanity label RitaLand, but she eventually returned to the label that had launched her and recorded three more albums with RCA. She also recorded a French language album with Phillips.

Italian discography
 Rita Pavone (1963, re-released on CD format in 2003)
 Non è Facile Avere 18 Anni (1964)
 Il Giornalino di Gian Burrasca (1965)
 Stasera Rita (1965)
 È Nata una Stella (1966, compilation)
 Ci Vuole Poco (1967)
 Little Rita nel West (1968)
 Rita 70
 Viaggio a Ritaland (1970)
 Gli Italiani Vogliono Cantare (1972)
 Rita ed Io (1976)
 RP (1980)
 Gemma e le Altre (1989)
Masters (2013)

U.S. discography
 Rita Pavone - The International Teenage Sensation (1964)
 Small Wonder (1964)
 This is Rita Pavone (1965)

French discography
 Dame Baby Poupée Philips – 9101 209 (1979)

RCA singles 1963–1970
 "La Partita di Pallone" / "Amore Twist" (1963)
 "Come Te Non-C'è Nessuno" / "Clementine Cherie" (1963)
 "Alla Mia Età" / "Pel di Carota"
 "Cuore" / "Il Ballo del Mattone" (1963)
 "Non è Facile Avere 18 Anni" / "Son Finite le Vacanze" (1964)
 "Che M'Importa del Mondo" / "Datemi un Martello" (1964) (Italian cover of "If I Had a Hammer")
 "Scrivi" / "Ti Vorrei Parlare" (1964)
 "L'amore Mio" / "San Francesco" (1964)
 "Viva la Pappa col Pomodoro" / "Sei la Mamma" (1965)
 "Lui" / "La Forza di lasciarti" (1965)
 "Il Plip" / "Supercalifragilispiespiralidoso" (1965)
 "Stasera Con Te" / "Solo Tu" (1965)
 "Il Geghegè" / "Qui Ritornerà" (1965)
 "Fortissimo / La Sai Troppo Lunga" (1966)
 "Mamma Dammi la Panna" / "Col Chicco" (1966)
 "La Zanzara" / "Perchè Due non-Fa Tre" (1966)
 "Dove Non-So" / "Gira Gira" (1967)
 "Una Notte Intera" / "Questo nostro amore" (1967)
 "Una Notte Intera" Promo Jolly Hotels
 "I Tre Porcellini" / "Con un Poco di Zucchero" (1967)
 "Non Dimenticar le Mie Parole" / "Da Cosa Nasce Cosa" (1967)
 "Tu Sei Come" / "Ma Che Te Ne Fai" (1968)
 "Zucchero" (1969)
 "Ahi, Ahi Ragazzo" (1970)

Filmography

References

External links

 Cecilia Brioni, 'Between Two Stages: Rita Pavone and i giovani on Studio Uno (1961–1966), Italian Studies, 72:4, p. 414–427. 

1945 births
Living people
Actors from Turin
Italian actresses
Italian women singers
German-language singers
French-language singers of Italy
English-language singers from Italy
Spanish-language singers of Italy
RCA Victor artists
Italian pop singers
Musicians from Turin